The Medicine Bow Post was a weekly newspaper published in Medicine Bow, Wyoming, from September 1977 to mid-1995.

David L. Roberts was the founding editor and publisher.  The newspaper served a wide area of south-central Wyoming which for a time was experiencing an economic boom from uranium and coal mining.  In 1988 Roberts donated the newspaper to the University of Wyoming Department of Journalism for use as a laboratory newspaper. Students studied and learned journalism at the newspaper until 1995, when the university shut down the paper.

The Medicine Bow Post won numerous awards from the Wyoming Press Association for general and editorial excellence, including five editorial leadership awards.  The paper received five National Newspaper awards.

Roberts now teaches journalism at Missouri Valley College, Marshall, Missouri.

References

Mass media in Wyoming
Newspapers published in Wyoming
Defunct companies based in Wyoming
Newspapers established in 1977
1977 establishments in Wyoming
1995 disestablishments in Wyoming